There was an election to the Greater London Council held on 7 May 1981. Councillors were elected to serve until elections in May 1985. Those elections were cancelled and the term was extended until 1 April 1986.

The leader of the Labour GLC group Andrew McIntosh led the party into the election. Within 24 hours of the result, however, McIntosh's leadership was toppled by Ken Livingstone; a member of the party's left-wing. Livingstone was then elected GLC leader.

This was the last election to the GLC.  The Conservative government of Margaret Thatcher soon took the decision to abolish the council in the mid-1980s, out of partisan concern that it would choose to defy right-wing policies.  For more information on this see the article, Greater London Council.  Following the abolition of the GLC, there was a direct election to the Inner London Education Authority in 1986.

Results

Turnout: 2,250,118 people voted.  All parties shown.

References

Footnotes

Greater London Council election
1981
Greater London Council election
Greater London Council election